Leonard Appleton (16 November 1892 – 1970) was an English footballer. He played for Blackpool, Exeter City and Southport.

References

1892 births
1970 deaths
English footballers
Blackpool F.C. players
Exeter City F.C. players
Southport F.C. players
Bolton Wanderers F.C. wartime guest players
Association football midfielders
People from the Metropolitan Borough of Wigan